Air Guinea was a short-lived airline based in Malabo, Equatorial Guinea. Its main base was Malabo International Airport.
The airline operated scheduled and chartered passenger flights and also featured a cargo department (Air Guinea Cargo). The airline was on the List of air carriers banned in the European Union.

Fleet 
The Air Guinea fleet included the following aircraft (as at February 2008):

 1 Boeing 727
1 Boeing 737-200

References

External links
Air Guinea Fleet

Defunct airlines of Equatorial Guinea
Airlines established in 2004
Airlines disestablished in 2005